Carlos Antonio Aguiar Burgos  (born December 19, 1978), or simply Carlos Aguiar, is a Uruguayan former footballer who played as a midfielder. He last played for C.D. Huachipato in Chile.

Career 
On 24 April 2009, he asked for the termination of his contract in order to leave Académica de Coimbra and return home.

Personal life 
He also holds Italian citizenship. Carlos is the brother of another professional footballer Luis Bernardo Aguiar.

References 

http://www.emol.com/especiales/2010/deportes/apertura_primera_a/despliegue.asp?idnoticia=423562

External links
 

1978 births
Living people
Uruguayan footballers
Uruguayan expatriate footballers
Club Atlético River Plate (Montevideo) players
Xanthi F.C. players
Independiente Medellín footballers
Racing Club de Montevideo players
Rampla Juniors players
Tiro Federal footballers
Liverpool F.C. (Montevideo) players
Associação Académica de Coimbra – O.A.F. players
C.D. Huachipato footballers
Uruguay Montevideo players
Chilean Primera División players
Expatriate footballers in Argentina
Expatriate footballers in Chile
Expatriate footballers in Greece
Expatriate footballers in Portugal
Uruguayan expatriate sportspeople in Argentina
Uruguayan expatriate sportspeople in Chile
Uruguayan expatriate sportspeople in Portugal
Club Atlético Fénix players
Association football midfielders

Uruguayan sportspeople of Italian descent